This article is a list of standard proofreader's marks used to indicate and correct problems in a text. Marks come in two varieties, abbreviations and abstract symbols. These are usually handwritten on the paper containing the text. Symbols are interleaved in the text, while abbreviations may be placed in a margin with an arrow pointing to the problematic text. Different languages use different proofreading marks and sometimes publishers have their own in-house proofreading marks.

Abbreviations

Symbols

Manuscripts
Depending on local conventions, underscores (underlines) may be used on manuscripts (and historically on typescripts) to indicate the special typefaces to be used:
single straight underline for italic type
single wavy underline for bold type
double straight underline for 
double underline of one straight line and one wavy line for bold italic
triple underline for FULL CAPITAL LETTERS (used among small caps or to change text already typed as lower case).

See also 
 ISO 5776
 Blue pencil (editing)

Notes

References

External links
 The Chicago Manual of Style Online: Proofreading
 Merriam-Webster: Proofreader's Marks
 British Standards Institution BS 5261C:2005 – Hardcopy for purchase
 (Online summary of BS5261, open access via "Proofmarks")
 Another (different) list of proofreading marks 

Copy editing
Proofreading